is a Japanese professional golfer.

Mikami played on the Japan Golf Tour, winning twice.

Professional wins (2)

Japan Golf Tour wins (2)

External links

Japanese male golfers
Japan Golf Tour golfers
1947 births
Living people